Tullycraft is an American indie pop band from Seattle, Washington, that formed in 1995. They have been associated with the genre of twee pop; in fact, they are considered to be one of the true pioneers of the American twee pop movement. They are known for their DIY ethic, only releasing albums on independently owned and operated record labels.

History

Formation and early recordings 
The band's original line-up was Sean Tollefson (bass/vocals), Gary Miklusek (guitar/vocals), and Jeff Fell (drums).

Prior to forming Tullycraft, both Tollefson and Fell played in the band Crayon in Bellingham, Washington and Miklusek played in the band Wimp Factor 14 in Pittsburgh, Pennsylvania. They met each other while their respective bands were on tour together.

On February 28, 1995, Tullycraft played their first show at ReBar, a small club in Seattle. Joining them on the bill that evening was the band Incredible Force of Junior. Eventually, Chris Munford (from Incredible Force of Junior) would join the group.

In October 1995 the band recorded four songs with producer Pat Maley at Yoyo Studios in Olympia, Washington. The recording session produced a debut single released on Harriet Records and an instant indiepop classic "Pop Songs Your New Boyfriend's Too Stupid To Know About". This song was listed as essential listening in Pitchforks 2005 article on Twee Pop entitled "Twee as Fuck."

Albums

Old Traditions, New Standards 
In 1996 the band released their full-length debut, Old Traditions, New Standards on Harriet Records. The album included the singles "Superboy & Supergirl" and "Josie". In 2022, Old Traditions, New Standards was included on Pitchforks list of The 25 Best Indie Pop Albums of the '90s. The following year the band released a series of 7" singles on labels in Japan, England, Germany, and the U.S. They built up a large following by touring extensively all over the United States.

City of Subarus 
Chris Munford officially joined Tullycraft in 1998 after a few guest appearances with the group. Munford contributed keyboards, guitar and recording engineer to the band's second full-length album, City of Subarus, released on Cher Doll Records that same year. The entire album was recorded in a house that Munford, Miklusek and Fell rented near the University of Washington in Seattle. Sean wrote about the experience of making this album on the band's website.

The Singles 
Guitarist and founding member, Gary Miklusek decided to leave the group after a U.S. tour for the City of Subarus album. His last appearance with the band was at the San Francisco Popfest in 1999. After the departure of Miklusek, the band's future was unclear. During the break a twenty-two track singles, b-sides and rarities compilation simply titled The Singles was released on Darla Records in late 1999.

Beat Surf Fun 
Following a hiatus that lasted most of 2000, the band started the writing process for what would become their third full-length album, Beat Surf Fun. Recording commenced in 2001 at a rehearsal space in Ballard, Washington. Harold Hollingsworth was recruited to take over lead guitar duties. Hollingsworth had played with the band briefly in 1997 on a U.S. tour.

The third album, Beat Surf Fun was released on Magic Marker Records in 2002. The album included the singles "Wild Bikini" and "Twee". In 2003, Tullycraft played shows in England, Sweden, Norway, and the Netherlands in support of the Beat Surf Fun album.

Disenchanted Hearts Unite 
In 2004, the band began working on what would be their fourth full-length album, Disenchanted Hearts Unite. Just prior to the album's release, guitarist Harold Hollingsworth left the band.

On May 3, 2005 Disenchanted Hearts Unite was released on Magic Marker Records. The band re-emerged with a new line-up that included Corianton Hale (lead guitar) and Jenny Mears (vocals). Some critics consider the album to be the band's finest. Although Tullycraft did not embark on a full U.S. tour to promote Disenchanted Hearts Unite, they did play a number of universities, the occasional pop festival, and the SXSW music festival in Austin, Texas in 2006 and 2007.

Every Scene Needs a Center 
On October 23, 2007, the fifth full-length album, Every Scene Needs a Center, was released on Magic Marker Records. The band spent over a year working on the album, splitting time between their own recording studio and Soundhouse Studio in Seattle, Washington. Described as a vampire indie-pop opera, the album included the singles "The Punks Are Writing Love Songs" and "Georgette Plays a Goth". In 2015 Magic Marker Records reissued Every Scene Needs a Center on limited edition vinyl.

Lost in Light Rotation 
After a three-year hiatus the band began working on a new album during the summer of 2012. Recording began with Pete Remine at Dubtrain Studio in Seattle. The songs were mixed at Avast Recording Co. with producer Phil Ek. The result was the band's sixth album, Lost in Light Rotation – the first Tullycraft full-length since 2007's Every Scene Needs a Center. The album received some of the best press in the band's career.

In January 2013 Fortuna Pop! released a 7" of the title track, "Lost in Light Rotation", as the first single from the forthcoming LP. The album was co-released in April 2013 by Magic Marker Records and Fortuna Pop!

The Railway Prince Hotel 
During the summer of 2017 Tullycraft regrouped and started recording what would become their seventh full-length studio album, The Railway Prince Hotel. As with their previous record, Lost in Light Rotation, the album was recorded and engineered by Pete Remine at Dubtrain Studio in Seattle, WA. After the release of a video for the song "Passing Observations" in December 2018, The Railway Prince Hotel was released on Happy Happy Birthday to Me Records on February 8, 2019.

Other

Live 
After years of touring fairly consistently, in 2009 Tullycraft stopped playing live.  On May 23, 2009, they performed in San Francisco, California. This was billed as the last show the band would play before taking a break from performing live. They have not played live in public since.

Film 
In 2001, Tullycraft was featured alongside Sleater-Kinney, Henry's Dress, Dub Narcotic Sound System, Unwound and The Make-Up in the Justin Mitchell music documentary, Songs for Cassavetes. The song, "Pop Songs Your New Boyfriend's Too Stupid To Know About" was used in the film's opening credits.

Television 
The song, "The Punks are Writing Love Songs" appeared on the CBS series, The Good Wife November 23, 2010 (Season 2, Ep. 8 "On Tap")

The song, "Superboy & Supergirl" appeared on the Netflix series, The End of the F***ing World January 5, 2018 (Season 1, Ep. 1)

Tribute albums 
 In 2003 a 22-song tribute album titled, First String Teenage High: The Songs of Tullycraft Played By People Who Aren't was released on AAJ/Bumblebear Records.
 In 2010 Wish I'd Kept A Scrapbook: A Tribute to Tullycraft was released on Unchikun Records. This second tribute album featured 21 bands and artists covering Tullycraft songs.

Radio Show 
In 2020 Sean Tollefson and his wife Liz began hosting a weekly radio show in Seattle, WA called Pop Songs Your New Boyfriend's Too Stupid to Know About. The one hour show on Space 101.1 FM features indie pop bands and artists from around the world. An archive of all the past episodes  is posted here: PopSongsMixTape.

Members 
 Sean Tollefson – Lead vocals and bass
 Chris Munford – Guitar and vocals
 Corianton Hale – Guitar and vocals
 Jenny Mears – Vocals and tambourine

Discography 
Albums

Singles and EPs

Compilations

See also 
 Crayon
 Six Cents and Natalie
 Cher Doll Records
 Rizzo

Bibliography 
 Strong, M. C. (2003). The Great Indie Discography (2nd Edition) pg. 1041. Published by Canon Books Ltd. (US/CAN)

Sources

References

External links 
 Official website
 Tullycraft at TweeNet
 

Indie rock musical groups from Washington (state)
Indie pop groups from Washington (state)
Musical groups from Seattle
Musical groups established in 1995
Cuddlecore musicians
Darla Records artists